Venombin AB (gabonase, okinaxobin II, Bitis gabonica venom serine proteinase, afaâ, cytin) is an enzyme. This enzyme catalyses the following chemical reaction

 Selective cleavage at Arg- bonds in fibrinogen to form fibrin and release fibrinopeptides A and B

This enzyme is isolated from the venom of the Gaboon viper Bitis gabonica.

References

External links 
 

EC 3.4.21